Lynn Yaeger is a contributing fashion editor to Vogue.com and a contributing writer to Vogue. She is a former fashion reporter for The Village Voice, having worked for the paper for 30 years. Her column, "Elements of Style", was renamed "Frock Star" in February 2007. Yaeger is also a regular contributor to The New York Times, The New Yorker, The Atlantic, Style Magazine, the American edition of Vogue magazine, Travel & Leisure, and countless antiques & collectibles dealers.

Yaeger is also a fashion columnist for Full Frontal Fashion, a style website in association with Sundance Channel. She is also the curator for the vintage section of fashion retail website yoox.com.

Style 
Yaeger is known for her eccentric personal style, powdered face and dark, cupid's-bow lipstick as well as cutting her own hair. In an interview with PAPER magazine, fashion designer Marc Jacobs said that Yaeger was one of his muses and her style has been noted to influence other fashion designers.

Awards 
In 2008, Yaeger won first place in the National Society of Newspaper Columnists' category of humor writing for newspapers with more than 100,000 circulation.

References

External links 
 Yaeger, Lynn. "Orchard Street: How the Other Half Lives", The Village Voice, July 7, 2008. 
 Yaeger, Lynn. "Lynn Yaeger Spends the Weekend in Paris", The Village Voice, July 7, 2008. 

American fashion journalists
Living people
Year of birth missing (living people)
Fashion editors
American women journalists
21st-century American journalists
Vogue (magazine) people
The Village Voice people
20th-century American journalists
Women magazine editors
20th-century American women
21st-century American women